Top Gear: Extra Gear, known simply as Extra Gear, is a British online television series, broadcast by BBC Three, which is online only and is available on on-demand service BBC iPlayer in the United Kingdom; the series serves as a spin-off show to Top Gear. In the first series, the main presenters were Top Gear co-presenters Rory Reid and Chris Harris. After Reid and Harris were appointed as main presenters to the parent show, comedian George Lewis was announced as the new lead presenter for series 2. Following Lewis’ departure, Reid returned as the presenter of the show for the third series.

Production
On 27 April 2016, it was announced that BBC Three had commissioned a spin-off programme to BBC Two motoring series Top Gear, entitled Extra Gear, presented by Top Gear co-presenter Rory Reid. The series is released online immediately following episodes from the twenty-third series of the main show, and features exclusive new footage, interviews, specially-recorded films and behind-the-scenes access to Top Gear.

Following his appointment, Reid stated that "Top Gear fans are some of the keenest in the world and with this show I’m giving them a chance to really get a peek behind the curtain. I’m looking forward to showing them how the show is made and what goes on behind the scenes, giving viewers a different perspective on some of the coolest cars on the planet." Reid won his place on the show after submitting a thirty-second audition video to a BBC open audition for the role.

On 24 May 2016, a behind-the-scenes trailer revealed that Reid would be joined by fellow Top Gear presenter Chris Harris, who would act as his co-presenter. Harris' addition was confirmed on 29 May 2016.

In 2017, the BBC announced following Harris and Reid's promotion to the main show, that comedian George Lewis would become the main presenter alongside the two. Reid would return, without Harris, for series 3.

After Series 4, the BBC confirmed that the show would not return.

Episodes

Series 1 (2016)

Series 2 (2017)

Series 3 (2018)

Series 4 (2019)

Broadcast
In the United States, Extra Gear is presented on BBC America immediately following the first airing of Top Gear. In Australia, the show is available (not broadcast) on on-demand service 9Now.

From series 2 onwards, reruns are broadcast on BBC Two, the broadcaster of parent show Top Gear.

References

External links
 

Top Gear
2016 British television series debuts
2019 British television series endings
English-language television shows
Driving in the United Kingdom
Television series by BBC Studios